William Hackett VC (11 June 1873 – 27 June 1916) was an English recipient of the Victoria Cross, the highest and most prestigious award for gallantry in the face of the enemy that can be awarded to British and Commonwealth forces.

Biography
Hackett was born 11 June 1873 to John and Harriet Hackett of Nottingham; he worked as a miner for 23 years. He was married to Alice née Tooby who received the medal on his behalf, and left two children, Arthur and Mary W. Hackett.
After being rejected three times by the York and Lancaster Regiment for being too old, Hackett  enlisted in the British Army on 25 October 1915, despite having been diagnosed with a heart condition. He spent two weeks of basic training at Chatham, joining 172nd Tunnelling Company. He later served with 254th Tunnelling Company, Corps of Royal Engineers. He was 43 years old and a Sapper in British Army during the First World War when he performed a deed for which he was awarded the Victoria Cross on 22 June/23 June 1916 at Shaftesbury Avenue Mine, near Givenchy-lès-la-Bassée, France.
Hackett died in an attempt to help fellow miners when a tunnel collapsed at Shaftesbury Avenue Mine on 26 June 1916.

Citation

Memorials

Hackett's name is recorded on the Ploegsteert Memorial to the Missing in Berks Cemetery Extension near Ploegsteert in Hainaut, Belgium. His Victoria Cross is displayed at the Royal Engineers Museum (Chatham, England).

In Givenchy-lès-la-Bassée, the Tunnellers Memorial commemorates the  action on 26 June 1916 for which  Hackett was awarded the Victoria Cross. The memorial stands at the site of the Shaftesbury Shaft and the Red Dragon Crater. The memorial was designed by Peter Barton and unveiled on 19 June 2010.

In fiction 
A tunneller with the same name, also a miner during World War I, is the main character in the 2020 movie The War Below, though his eventual fate is different to that of the real Hackett.

References

External links
Tunnellers Memorial
Monuments to Courage (David Harvey, 1999)
The Register of the Victoria Cross (This England, 1997)
The Sapper VCs (Gerald Napier, 1998)
Royal Engineers Museum Sappers VCs

Royal Engineers soldiers
British World War I recipients of the Victoria Cross
British military personnel killed in World War I
British Army personnel of World War I
1873 births
1916 deaths
British coal miners
English miners
British Army recipients of the Victoria Cross
Tunnel warfare in World War I
Military personnel from Nottingham